Richard Silcock (second ¼ 1878 – second ¼ 1936) was an English professional rugby league footballer who played in the 1900s and 1910s, and coached in the 1920s and 1930s. He played at representative level for Great Britain and England, and at club level for Leigh (Heritage № 141), and Wigan, as a forward (prior to the specialist positions of), during the era of contested scrums, and coached at club level for Castleford.

Background
Dick Silcock's birth was registered in Wigan district, Lancashire, England, and his death was registered in Wigan district, Lancashire, England.

Playing career

International honours
Dick Silcock won a cap for England while at Leigh in 1906 against Other Nationalities, and won a cap for Great Britain while at Wigan in 1909 against Australia.

Championship final appearance
Dick Silcock played as a forward, i.e. number 11, in Wigan's 7–3 victory over Oldham in the Championship Final during the 1908–09 season at The Willows, Salford on Saturday 1 May 1909.

County Cup Final appearances
Dick Silcock played as a forward, i.e. number 11, in Wigan's 10–9 victory over Oldham in the 1908–09 Lancashire County Cup Final during the 1908–09 season at Wheater's Field, Broughton, on Saturday 19 December 1908, played as a forward, i.e. number 8, in the 22–5 victory over Leigh in the 1909–10 Lancashire County Cup Final during the 1909–10 season at Wheater's Field, Broughton, on Saturday 27 November 1909, and played as a forward, i.e. number 11, in the 21–5 victory over Rochdale Hornets in the 1912–13 Lancashire County Cup Final during the 1912–13 season at Weaste, Salford, on Wednesday 11 December 1912.

Coaching career
Silcock was the coach of Castleford, his first game in charge was on 31 August 1929, and his last game in charge was on 22 April 1930.

References

1878 births
1936 deaths
Castleford Tigers coaches
England national rugby league team players
English rugby league coaches
English rugby league players
Great Britain national rugby league team players
Leigh Leopards players
Rugby league forwards
Rugby league players from Wigan
Wigan Warriors players